Below is a list of Singaporean films of 2013:

References

Films